The twenty-third season of the American crime-drama television series Law & Order: Special Victims Unit was ordered on February 27, 2020, by NBC. It was set to air during the 2021–2022 television season, the season was produced by Wolf Entertainment and Universal Television; the showrunner was Warren Leight, in the third and final season of his second stint in the role. The season premiered on September 23, 2021, and concluded on May 19, 2022. The series' milestone 500th episode aired this season as the sixth episode and saw the return of former  Detective Nick Amaro and former SVU Captain Don Cragen. This is the last season for Jamie Gray Hyder and Demore Barnes as they departed in the premiere episode. The season consisted of 22 episodes.

Cast and characters

Main
 Mariska Hargitay as Captain Olivia Benson
 Kelli Giddish as Senior Detective Amanda Rollins
 Ice-T as Senior Detective Sergeant Odafin "Fin" Tutuola
 Peter Scanavino as Assistant District Attorney Dominick "Sonny" Carisi, Jr.
 Jamie Gray Hyder as Junior Detective Katriona "Kat" Tamin 
 Demore Barnes as Deputy Chief Christian Garland )
 Octavio Pisano as Junior Detective Joe Velasco

Special guest stars after their departure
 Tamara Tunie as Chief Medical Examiner Melinda Warner 
 Danny Pino as Former Detective Nick Amaro 
 Dann Florek as Former Captain Donald Cragen 
 Raúl Esparza as Defense Attorney (former Assistant District Attorney) Rafael Barba 
 Donal Logue as Captain Declan Murphy

Crossover stars from Law & Order: Organized Crime
 Christopher Meloni as Organized Crime Control Bureau Senior Detective Elliot Stabler
 Danielle Moné Truitt as Organized Crime Control Bureau Sergeant Ayanna Bell 
 Ainsley Seiger as Organized Crime Control Bureau Junior Detective Jet Slootmaekers 
 Dylan McDermott as Richard Wheatley
 Tamara Taylor as Professor Angela Wheatley
 Nick Creegan as Richard "Richie" Wheatley, Jr.
 Allison Siko as Kathleen Stabler
 Nicky Torchia as Elliot "Eli" Stabler, Jr.
 Jeffrey Scaperrotta as Richard "Dickie" Stabler

Recurring

 Terry Serpico as Chief Tommy McGrath
 Ben Rappaport as Congressman George Howard
 Zabryna Guevara as Dr. Catalina Machado
 Saverio Guerra as Paulie Banducci
 TJ Lee as Celia Long
 Ryan Garbayo as Ruben Ortiz
 Aime Donna Kelly as Internal Affairs Bureau Captain Renee Curry
 Stephen C. Bradbury as Judge Colin McNamara
 Angelic Zambrana as Rosa Estrada
 Jeffrey Schecter as Counselor Art Blumfeld
 Carrie Kim as Celine Tatou
 Adrian Alvarado as Detective Ray Fernandez
 Frank Wood as Medical Examiner Abel Truman

 Michael Dempsey as Elvis Baktashi
 Ryan Buggle as Noah Porter-Benson
 Aida Turturro as Judge Felicia Catano
 Eddie Hargitay as Officer Eddie Montero
 Kadia Saraf as United States Attorney Anya Avital
 Michael Mastro as Judge D. Serani
 Peter Hermann as Defense Attorney Trevor Langan
 Joe Grifasi as Judge Hashi Horowitz
 Ari'el Stachel as Sergeant Hasim Khaldun
 Jason Biggs as Detective Andy Parlato-Goldstein
 Cyndee Rivera as Detective Mia Ruz
 Betty Buckley as Trial Division Chief Assistant District Attorney Lorraine Maxwell
 Teagle F. Bougere as Bureau Chief Assistant District Attorney Phillip Baptiste
 Aidan Quinn as Burton Lowe

Episodes

Ratings

Notes

References

23
2021 American television seasons
2022 American television seasons